The Singing Christians were a Southern gospel music band. They released five albums on the Canaan Records label and charted in the Southern gospel radio markets.

Wayne Christian led the band, performing at concert venues and ’All night gospel singings’ across the deep south and the southwestern United States. In 1975, the group became a regular headliner on the Wally Fowler Show. The band hosted their own music festival in East Texas, featuring many Southern gospel quartets, drawing thousands of Christian music fans each year. The Singing Christians became the first group to perform and headline on the Kerrville Gospel Jubilee.

Several former Singing Christians members impacted the music industry beyond the scope of the group. Wayne Christian served as president of the Gospel Music Association. Starting in 1997, Christian served 16 consecutive years representing District 9 in the Texas House Of Representatives. Gary Goss went on to travel with Governor Jimmie Davis. In 1986, Goss became the music and tour director for Country music singer Johnny Rodriguez. John Mays played bass guitar for the Speer Family after leaving the Singing Christians. He later served as head of Benson Records and Canaan Records. Emory Atkins became a record producer, singer-songwriter, and audio-recording engineer in Nashville, Tennessee.

After the band ended their career as The Singing Christians in 1979, the remaining eight members rebranded themselves as a Christian country music group, changing their name to the Mercy River Boys.

In 2015, Wayne Christian, Emory Atkins, Danny Hollis, Ronny Ricks, Gary Goss, and all the band members of the Singing Christians and Mercy River Boys were inducted into the Texas Gospel Music Hall of Fame.

Discography

References

Southern gospel performers
Musical groups from Texas
Singers from Texas
Shelby County, Texas
Christian music
Performers of Christian music
American performers of Christian music
Musical groups established in 1973
Musical groups disestablished in 1979
1973 establishments in Texas
1979 disestablishments in Texas
Music of Texas